Pottage or potage is a term for a thick soup or stew made by boiling vegetables, grains, and, if available, meat or fish. It was a staple food for many centuries. The word pottage comes from the same Old French root as potage, which is a dish of more recent origin.

Pottage ordinarily consisted of  various ingredients easily available to peasants. It could be kept over the fire for a period of days, during which time some of it could be eaten, and more ingredients added. The result was a dish that was constantly changing. Pottage consistently remained a staple of poor people's diet throughout most of 9th to 17th-century Europe. When wealthier people ate pottage, they would add more expensive ingredients such as meats. The pottage that these people ate was much like modern-day soups.

Preparation
Pottage was typically boiled for several hours until the entire mixture took on a homogeneous texture and flavour; this was intended to break down complex starches and to ensure the food was safe for consumption. It was often served, when possible, with bread.

Biblical references

In the King James Bible translation of the story of Jacob and Esau in the Book of Genesis, Esau, being famished, sold his birthright (the rights of the eldest son) to his twin brother Jacob in exchange for a meal of "bread and pottage of lentils" (Gen 25:29-34). This incident is the origin of the phrase a "mess of pottage" (which is not in any Biblical text) to mean a bad bargain involving short-term gain and long-term loss.

In the Revised Standard Version Catholic Edition translation of the Bible, the prophet Elisha purifies a pot of poisoned pottage that was set before the sons of the prophets (2 Kings 4:38-41).

England
Pottage had long been a staple of the English diet. During the Middle Ages it was usually made with wheat, barley, rye, or oats. Thinner pottages were said to be . Frumenty was a pottage made with fresh cleaned wheat grain that was boiled until it burst, allowed to cool, then boiled with broth and either cow milk or almond milk, and thickened with egg yolk and flavored with sugar and spices.

The earliest known cookery manuscript in the English language, The Forme of Cury, written by the court chefs of King Richard II in 1390, contains several potage recipes including one made from cabbage, ham, onions and leeks. A slightly later manuscript from the 1430s is called  Potage Dyvers ("Various Potages"). During the Tudor period, a good many English peasants' diets consisted almost solely of potage. Some Tudor-era people ate self-cultivated vegetables like cabbages and carrots and a few were able to supplement this from fruit gardens with fruit trees nearby.

Some pottages that were typical of medieval cuisine were frumenty, jelly (flesh or fish in aspic), mawmenny (a thickened stew of capon or similar fowl), and pears in syrup. There were also many kinds of potages made of thickened liquids (such as milk and almond milk) with mashed flowers or mashed or strained fruit.

France
Potage has its origins in the medieval cuisine of northern France and increased in popularity from the High Middle Ages onward. A course in a medieval feast often began with one or two potages, which would be followed by roasted meats.

European cottage gardens often contained a variety of crops grown together. These were called potage gardens by the French, as the harvest from that garden was used to make potage.

Colonial America
Native American cuisine also had a similar dish, but it was made with maize rather than the traditional European grain varieties. An early 17th century British recipe for pottage was made by boiling mutton and oatmeal with violet leaves, endive, chicory, strawberry leaves, spinach, langdebeefe, marigold flowers, scallions and parsley.

In the cuisine of New England, pottage began as boiled grain, vegetables, seasonings and meat, fowl or fish. This simple staple of early American cuisine eventually evolved into the chowders and baked beans typical of New England's cuisine. A version of "scotch barley broth" is attested to in the 18th century colonial recipe collection called Mrs Gardiner's Family Receipts.  Pottages were probably served at the First Thanksgiving. Indian succotash, sometimes called pondomenast or Indian pottage was made with boiled corn and, when available, meat like venison, bear, moose, otter, raccoon or beaver. Dried fish like shad, eel, or herring could be used in place of the meat. Kidney beans were sometimes mixed into Indian pottage, along with fruits like  Jerusalem artichoke, pumpkin, squash. Ground nuts like  acorns, chestnuts or walnuts were used to thicken the pottage.

Spanish cuisine
According to Spanish cuisine religious customs, if a festa doble (a "double feast" in the church) fell on a meat day two consecutive potatge courses were served, one of which would be a cheese-topped rice or noodle dish, the other a meat stew cooked in "salsa" made from wine, vinegar, parsley, spleen, liver, saffron, egg yolks and assorted spices. Two potaje courses were also served for fish days, first high-quality spinach from the monastery gardens topped with peppers, or cabbage or lettuce (if spinach could not be found), followed by either a bowl of semolina or noodles or rice cooked in almond milk, or a grain bowl of semolina groats seasoned with cinnamon.

Nigeria
In Nigeria the words pottage and porridge are synonymous, and  such foods are consumed as a main meal. Nigerian yam pottage/porridge includes tomatoes and other culinary vegetables along with the yam. It may also have fish and/or other meat.

Wales
This is similar to the Welsh cawl, which is a broth, soup or stew often cooked on and off for days at a time over the fire in a traditional inglenook.

See also
 Brown Windsor soup
 Casserole
 Cawl
 Frumenty
 Lancashire hotpot
 Lentil soup
 List of soups
 List of stews
 Medieval cuisine
 Pease pudding
 Potted meat
 Sop

Notes

Informational notes

References

External links
 Potage à la Reine, a Dutch variation of potage
 How to Make Potage With Cooked Rice
 Paris' real passion is in the potage

Stews
Historical foods
British cuisine
Turkish cuisine
Nigerian cuisine
Staple foods
Medieval cuisine
Soups

de:Eintopf